Nesta Pierre Guinness-Walker (born 14 September 1999) is an English professional footballer who plays as a left back for Reading.

Personal life
He is the grandson of actor Matthew Guinness and the great-grandson of actor Sir Alec Guinness. He grew up in Twickenham and is of part-Barbadian descent.

Career
Guinness-Walker played youth football for Chelsea and Tottenham Hotspur, spending two years with Chelsea and one year with Tottenham, before leaving at the age of 11, before playing Sunday League football as a teenager. He joined non-league Metropolitan Police at the age of 17. Following a successful trial period he signed for AFC Wimbledon in May 2019. He scored his first goal for Wimbledon in a 2–1 defeat to Ipswich Town on 20 August 2019. He was offered a new contract by the club at the end of the 2021–22 season, but he left the club on 5 July 2022.

On 29 July 2022, Reading announced the signing of Guinness-Walker on a one-year contract following a successful trial.

Career statistics

References

1999 births
Living people
English sportspeople of Barbadian descent
English footballers
Chelsea F.C. players
Tottenham Hotspur F.C. players
Metropolitan Police F.C. players
AFC Wimbledon players
Association football fullbacks
Southern Football League players
English Football League players
Nesta